Augmented learning is an on-demand learning technique where the environment adapts to the learner. By providing remediation on-demand, learners can gain greater understanding of a topic while stimulating discovery and learning.

Technologies incorporating rich media and interaction have demonstrated the educational potential that scholars, teachers and students are embracing.  Instead of focusing on memorization, the learner experiences an adaptive learning experience based upon the current context. The augmented content can be dynamically tailored to the learner's natural environment by displaying text, images, video or even playing audio (music or speech). This additional information is commonly shown in a pop-up window for computer-based environments.

Most implementations of augmented learning are forms of e-learning. In desktop computing environments, the learner receives supplemental, contextual information through an on-screen, pop-up window, toolbar or sidebar. As the user navigates a website, e-mail or document, the learner associates the supplemental information with the key text selected by a mouse, touch or other input device. In mobile environments, augmented learning has also been deployed on tablets and smartphones.

Augmented learning is often used by corporate learning and development providers to teach innovative thinking and leadership skills by emphasizing “learning-by-doing”. Participants are required to apply the skills gained from e-learning platforms to real life examples. Data is used to create a personalized learning program for each participant, providing supplemental information and remediation.

Augmented learning is closely related to augmented intelligence (intelligence amplification) and augmented reality. Augmented intelligence applies information processing capabilities to extend the processing capabilities of the human mind through distributed cognition. Augmented intelligence provides extra support for autonomous intelligence and has a long history of success. Mechanical and electronic devices that function as augmented intelligence range from the abacus, calculator, personal computers and smart phones. Software with augmented intelligence provide supplemental information that is related to the context of the user. When an individual's name appears on the screen, a pop-up window could display a person's organizational affiliation, contact information and most recent interactions.

In mobile reality systems, the annotation may appear on the learner's individual "heads-up display" or through headphones for audio instruction. For example, apps for Google Glasses can provide video tutorials and interactive click-throughs, .

Foreign language educators are also beginning to incorporate augmented learning techniques to traditional paper-and-pen-based exercises. For example, augmented information is presented near the primary subject matter, allowing the learner to learn how to write glyphs while understanding the meaning of the underlying characters. See Understanding language, below.

Just-in-time understanding and learning
Augmentation tools can help learners understand issues, acquire relevant information and solve complex issues by presenting supplementary information at the time of need or "on demand." This contrasts with traditional methods of associative learning, including rote learning, classical conditioning and observational learning, where the learning is performed in advance of the learner's need to recall or apply what has been learned.

Snyder and Wilson assert that just-in-time learning is not sufficient. Long-term learning demands continuous training should be individualized and built upon individual competencies and strengths.

Understanding language
Augmented learning tools have been useful for learners to gain an enhanced understanding of words or to understand a foreign language. The interactive, dynamic nature of these on-demand language assistants can provide definitions, sample sentences and even audible pronunciations. When sentences or blocks of text are selected, the words are read aloud while the user follows along with the native text or phonetics. Speech rate control can tailor the text-to-speech (TTS) to keep pace with the learner's comprehension.

The use of augmented learning has already been implemented in schools across the world. New technology is constantly being developed to hone the skills of students both in and out of the classroom. People other than students can also use these resources to learn or develop their own language skills on their own time and in the language they choose to learn. Websites such as Rosetta Stone have been around for a number of years and allow for people of all ages from all around the world to learn a new language. Many of these applications and websites are pay to use. One application that allows for free learning is Duolingo that allows for both free learning and paid learning. Augmented learning allows for real time answers to student's quizzes and tests that provide feedback quicker than in class discussion. This type of feedback also allows for students to move through the class at their own pace. If an answer is correct the student may move on to new and more challenging questions. While if the answer is incorrect the student may be prompted to study more and are given more practice questions based on the incorrect answer. In an in-person classroom students have to move at the pace of the rest of the class which may cause students to not gain a full understanding of the content and leave many struggling to keep up. The use of it also has shown more correct answers up to 95% of the time for their reading. Most forms of augmented learning can be found on the internet through websites apps on your mobile device. This allows for students and regular people that are interested in learning a new language the ease of access not found in a standard textbook. This also allows for learning where every you may go without the restriction a classroom would hold. These applications also allow for more direct one on one instruction that would not be found in a classroom of twenty plus students. Students are able to submit an answer and get an immediate score back for their work. The downside of augmented learning for language learning is that it may end up putting language teachers out of the job. As these programs develop, they may prove to be far more effective at teaching students than a physical teacher ever could be. This would put thousands of language teachers across the globe out of the job and force them in fields they may not enjoy as much. Other problems associated with augmented language learning is the extensive use of technology with no face-to-face learning. Students may suffer from fatigue from sitting at a computer for hours a day which would affect their learning and development in the class. Social isolation from online language learning may also occur. It would affect students' mental health not having regular face to face interaction with other students. While this may kind of learning may help some students it could have severely harmful effects on others. Tech problems are also an everyday problem we all struggle with. Issues with the website or application may cause students to miss assignments or an online class and harm their grade because of an issue they have no control over. Issues like this presented themselves fully when the covid-19 pandemic began and showed that many students would have technology issues leaving them stranded in their learning. The use of augmented learning poses many pros and cons that may entice schools to adapt and use the programs provided to a greater extent. As these programs grow and develop, more and more students will become more efficient in the classroom and any real-world situations where they can use the information gained from augmented learning to their advantage.

Understanding Science 
Augmented reality has come a long way in the science field, but it is still in its infancy. They have started using webcams, making them read a certain marker label, then an object where the label would be comes up on the screen. Developers are continuing to gather information on how AR (augmented reality) could take its part in the learning environment. Over the past few years there have been technologies added to the classroom such as computers, laptops, projectors, white boards and much more. It is allowing students to be more engaged in what is happening.

Students are also now able to take notes without having to listening to what the teacher is saying, but instead writing what they typed on the projector. The notes can be more thorough and to the point, rather than an entire explanation. With the help of AR we can also see pictures on the board showing students the space in between certain objects such as planets or atoms.

Making learning fun
One researcher has suggested that handheld devices like cell phones and portable game machines (Game Boy, PlayStation Portable) can make an impact on learning. These mobile devices excel in their portability, context sensitivity, connectivity and ubiquity. By incorporating social dynamics in a real-world context, learning games can create compelling environments for learners.

At the Allard Pierson Museum in Amsterdam, visitors view information on-demand at the "A Future for the Past" exhibit. In a virtual reconstruction of Satricum and the Forum Romanum, users can call up information that is overlaid on room-sized photos and other images. The museum uses both stationary displays and mobile computers to allow users to view translucent images and information keyed to their specific interest.

The issue with todays generation is that it is difficult to hold their attention for any longer than a few minutes. This can come from several different reasons. The students could have ADHD, a short attention span, difficulty focusing, they could just not be interested in the information they are learning, or not be interested in school in general. Even so, its the job of the teachers to keep their attention and make them interested. There are many different ways to go about this, but a good way to accomplish this is by making learning fun. Today’s generation is one of technology, so a good way to make learning fun is by using technology. Since kid are more adept with technology, it gives a chance for school and teachers to become more adept with them too in order to reach their students and make them want to learn. For example, if schools and teachers wanted to teach their students about construction and building creativity, then the teachers can have their class play a game called Minecraft, which is an open world creativity based game, or a game called Homemaker, its basically similar to the house building feature of the Sims games. Or, if they want the students to learn about math and other subjects they could have them play CoolMathGames At the current moment, just about every grade and the majority of schools, from pre-school to college, use technology to help students learn and make learning fun.  

Games

Throughout the years schools have found several different games that are more learning focused. For example, on mobile devices there is stack the state and stack the countries that help you learn about the states/countries as well as learn about geography. Also, there is a game call alchemy that is more science based with a little bit of fun to it. There are also several other games that help you learn about a variety of subjects, and one of those games that is mainly used in elementary schools is a website called CoolMathGames. As the name suggests, the main subject of learning is math, but it also teaches other subjects too. It has thousands of games that works on many different areas of learning. Its goal, as well as its sister websites Coolmath and coolmath4kids, is to match learning with fun and games. Although the website is getting close to 30 years old, they are still helping students to this day.

English Learning

Learning English can be difficult no matter what age you are, but learning a language can be difficult for the younger age group due to retention and learning capabilities. But, with the use of technology it can help be made easy. Nowadays, one can listen to the pronunciation, look up spelling, and all sorts of things to help better a students education.

Application of technology in college 

With the expansion of the uses of technology students are able to learn in all sorts of matters. For the most part, college students nowadays have classes, assignments, homework, and projects online via different websites and turn them in via those websites. And now, teachers have found a practical use for some new technology within the classrooms. For example, schools nowadays have pieces of technology to help classes. Some school in medical schools a giant tablet the size of a table and use it to show bones, blood vessels, veins, and other parts of the body. In other colleges with similar programs they have games that they use in specific class subjects. They use these games to learn how to examine or in practical use they could learn how to work in their field of study with the help technology.

Is augmentation really "learning"?
Critics may see learning augmentation as a crutch that precludes memorization; similar arguments have been made about using calculators in the past. Just as rote learning is also not a substitute for understanding, augmented learning is simply another faculty for helping learners recall, present and process information.

Current research suggests that even unconscious visual learning can be effective. Visual stimuli, rendered in flashes of information, showed signs of learning even when the human adult subjects were unaware of the stimulus or reward contingencies.

One way to look at augmentation is whether the process leads to improvement in terms of signal to noise ratio for the individual learner. Diverse predispositions among varied learners means there can be great disparity in signal processing by different learners for any one particular instruction method.

Although people have their doubts about the effectiveness of augmented and virtual reality in classrooms, they are very useful tools for teachers and educators around the world. It is proven by studies that AR can improve student understanding of complex or invisible structures. AR and VR are capable of introducing children to new concepts in fun and encouraging ways that they cannot get from a chalk board or classroom. Not only do these realities help children learn, but they also help researchers identify what specific traits aid or hinder a child’s learning capabilities.  

These mediums for education include the ability to perform experiments virtually rather than in-person due to them proposing risk or health concerns. One study conducted was focused on the understanding of electromagnetism; In comparison to a non-AR environment, AR proved to increase the students’ ability to visualize structural phenomena, reduced cognitive load, and improved motivation and self-confidence. However, this seems to only be the case for physical experiences, and there has not been anything to prove AR’s dominance in a person’s understanding of theoretical concepts. It is for this reason that AR will not take over classrooms entirely but will be a great advancement in children's understanding of STEM concepts.

It is important to remember that this is still an under-researched and relatively new technology for schools to implement. The technology that is used for creating AR experiences dates back to 1990, however, it was not widely used for educational purposes until around 2010. There is a lot that can be done to improve how AR is used in educational settings. It is also to be noted what types of studies were conducted. A large portion of the research documented is narrative-based and qualitative literature reviews, however, some suggest that it would be more accurate and credible to perform meta-analyses. A meta-analysis is in short, a way of gathering lots of individual research experiments and studying them to make more predictions on what the information tells us. This will provide a more valid representation of data found due to the sheer number of studies that were incorporated, along with the studies differing in their research methods, rather than the findings of just one case.

AR opens a whole world of exploration for people to be able to not only learn, but to want to continue learning. Through the use of 3D VLE's, AR allows people to travel to any place that they like in seconds that would otherwise be either expensive or impossible to get to. This means that a person can be anywhere in the world and immerse themselves in the culture of the place that they travel to. AR makes travelling and studying phenomena more interactive and entices us to keep using it because of its easy access and fun nature.

Augmented Learning in Education 
Augmented learning has allowed not only students to learn, but also their parents. Tools like mobile games have made it easier for parents to understand more fully what their child is learning in school. Technology brings the child's content to a new platform which is helpful to parents when trying to make meaningful connections to what their child is learning in school. Furthermore, augmented reality has brought a new way of learning to young children to have the ability to articulate words. By using marker labels in books that are read by a tablet, making pictures appear on the screen along with audio narration for enhanced reading.

Augmented Reality in education has the potential to change the timing and location of the conventional learning process. This style of learning introduces new methods of studying. With the boom of technology and younger students being the biggest users, the learning platform has the ability to connect this generation and their smartphones to gain knowledge. Though it has yet to be fully discovered, Augmented Reality in education is looking to become a large market.

This style of learning can gain attention and expand the students interest in subject and topics he would not learn or come across in the conventional classroom lecture. Extra data such as fun facts, visual models, or historical data from events could give a wider understanding of the topics being taught. The learning platform hopes to explain abstract concepts, engage and interact with the learner, and discover and learn additional information about what they what to learn.

See also
 Electronic learning
 Evidence-based learning
 Intelligence amplification

References

Sources
 Karacapilidis, Nikos (2009). Solutions and Innovations in Web-Based Technologies for Augmented Learning: Improved Platforms, Tools, and Applications. PA: IGI Global. , 
 Milne, Andre J. (1999). Shaping the Future of Technology-Augmented Learning Environments: Report on a Planning Charrette at Stanford University. https://web.archive.org/web/20100708025551/http://www-cdr.stanford.edu/~amilne/Publish/SCUP-34_Abstract.PDF

External links
 Loqu8 iCE Augmented learning software for understanding Chinese. Point or highlight Chinese text in webpages and documents. Displays definitions (in English, German and French), Pinyin and Bopomofo. Reads words aloud in Chinese (Mandarin, Cantonese).
 Augmented reality Augmented Reality Technology Brings Learning to Life

Learning
Cognitive science
Intelligence
Systems science